Ultimate Collection is the second greatest hits album by British pop duo Eurythmics, released on 7 November 2005 by RCA Records. This set preceded (by one week) the reissue of all eight Eurythmics back-catalogue albums originally released by RCA Records. These reissues include remastered tracks and bonus material. The fact that the Ultimate Collection was closely connected to these reissues is also the chief reason for the omission of "Sexcrime (Nineteen Eighty-Four)". While that song peaked at number four in the United Kingdom in 1984 and was later featured on the previous Greatest Hits album released in 1991, it is actually taken from the 1984 Virgin Records soundtrack album 1984 (For the Love of Big Brother), Eurythmics' only album to date not to be released by RCA Records in the UK.

Unlike 1991's Greatest Hits, Ultimate Collection contains two previous unreleased songs, "I've Got a Life" and "Was It Just Another Love Affair?", both recorded during the Peace album sessions, and all of the tracks have been remastered. Also unlike the 1991 compilation, Ultimate Collection contains no tracks from the duo's 1989 album We Too Are One.

One of the new songs, "I've Got a Life", was released as a single. It entered the UK Singles Chart at number 14 and spent three weeks at number one on the Hot Dance Club Play chart in the United States.

Ultimate Collection peaked at number five on the UK Albums Chart and has since been certified triple platinum by the British Phonographic Industry (BPI).

Track listing

Personnel
Credits adapted from the liner notes of Ultimate Collection.

 David A. Stewart – production 
 Adam Williams – production 
 Eurythmics – production 
 Stevie Wonder – harmonica 
 Aretha Franklin – vocals 
 Lewis Ziolek – photography
 Peter Ashworth – photography
 Michael Segal – photography
 Laurence Stevens – art direction, graphic design
 Ian Cooper – mastering, remastering

Charts

Weekly charts

Year-end charts

Certifications and sales

References

2005 greatest hits albums
2005 video albums
Albums produced by David A. Stewart
Arista Records compilation albums
Eurythmics compilation albums
Eurythmics video albums
Music video compilation albums
RCA Records compilation albums
RCA Records video albums